Grace Church Cathedral, located in Charleston, South Carolina, is the diocesan cathedral of the Episcopal Church in South Carolina. It is also a contributing property in the Charleston Historic District. The parish was founded as the city's fifth Episcopal Church congregation in 1846. The Gothic Revival church was designed by E.B. White and completed in 1848. The church remained open during the American Civil War until it was hit by a shell in January 1864. It reopened the following year. The church was also severely damaged in an earthquake in August 1886, in a hurricane in 1911, and in Hurricane Hugo in 1989.

It was selected to be the cathedral at the annual diocesan convention in November 2015; the previous diocesan cathedral, the Cathedral of St. Luke and St. Paul, became affiliated with the Anglican Diocese of South Carolina in 2012. Robert Willis, Dean of Canterbury, presented the newly designated cathedral with a Canterbury Cross at a special service in April 2016.  Episcopal Church Presiding Bishop Michael Curry was also present.

See also
List of the Episcopal cathedrals of the United States
List of cathedrals in the United States

References

External links
Official website

Religious organizations established in 1846
Churches completed in 1848
19th-century Episcopal church buildings
Episcopal Church in South Carolina
Episcopal cathedrals in South Carolina
Churches in Charleston, South Carolina
Gothic Revival church buildings in South Carolina
Historic district contributing properties in South Carolina
Churches on the National Register of Historic Places in South Carolina